"Dover–Calais" is a ballad song written by Tommy Ekman and Christer Sandelin, and originally performed by Style on 22 March 1986 at Melodifestivalen where the song ended up third.

The song lyrics describe a love meeting between two people on board a ferryboat moving across the English Channel between the UK and France in a pre-"Chunnel" era.

The song topped the Swedish singles chart, and peaked at 6th position in Norway. At Svensktoppen the song stayed for 18 weeks between the period of 13 April–29 June 1986, topping the chart during the seven first weeks.

On 29 March 1986 the song also entered Trackslistan, reaching the first position on 5 April that year.

Charts

Recordings
In 1986 Gothenburg band Di få under bordi recorded the song Domus–Paleys. The title refers to the Evas Paley cafe and the Domus Avenyn.
In Ernst-Hugo Järegård cited the lyrics in the radio program Eldorado, accompanied by music. This version became available on the 1987 compilation album Eldorado. Äventyret fortsätter....

References

External links
Information at Svensk mediedatabas
Information at Svensk mediedatabas

1986 songs
1986 singles
Melodifestivalen songs of 1986
Pop ballads
Swedish-language songs
Number-one singles in Sweden
Songs written by Christer Sandelin